Livein Cognito is a double live album by saxophonist Tim Berne's Big Satan. It was released in 2006 on Berne's Screwgun label.

Reception

An All About Jazz review by John Kelman said "Dark and spacious in places, visceral, dense and penetrating in others, the impact of Livein Cognito can be heard in the audience's response. They may not always know how they're getting where they're going, but Big Satan fans can always be assured an intriguing trip". A JazzTimes review by Mike Shanley said "The synergy of Big Satan—Berne, Ducret and Rainey—is on full display on Livein Cognito, a two-disc live set. The herky-jerky and the ungrounded qualities of the music sometimes make things blend together".

Track listing
All compositions by Tim Berne except as indicated

Disc One: Desperate
 "Deadpan" - 10:59
 "L' Ombra Di Verdi" (Marc Ducret) - 11:48   
 "Untitled" (Ducret) - 14:13   
 "Ce Sont les Noms des Mots" (Ducret) - 17:05   
 "Un Peu D'Histoire" (Ducret) - 9:36

Disc Two: MoreDesperate
 "Mechanicals Failure" - 10:30   
 "Mr. Subliminal" - 12:32   
 "Untitled" (Ducret) - 16:19   
 "The Mini-Bar Incident" (Berne, Ducret) - 11:00   
 "Cause and Reflect" (Ducret) - 11:27   
 "BG Uh Oh" (Berne, Baikida Carroll) - 9:14

Personnel
Tim Berne – alto saxophone
Marc Ducret – guitar
Tom Rainey – drums

References 

2006 live albums
Tim Berne live albums
Screwgun Records live albums